"Nevada" is a 1928 Western novel by Zane Grey, a sequel to 1927's Forlorn River. Prior to its book publication it was serialized in seven issues of The American Magazine (November 1926 – May 1927). The novel was adapted for films in 1927 and 1944.

Plot introduction

Ben Ide, restless with the rancher life, moves his family to Arizona, ostensibly for his mother's health, but also to search for his missing partner Nevada.  He buys a beautiful ranch, in a territory known for cattle rustling.  The deal soon sours as he struggles to keep his cattle and prize horses from the network of rustlers about the wild country of Arizona, not sure who he can trust and who he can't.  Hettie Ide pines away for the missing Nevada, meanwhile fending off a horde of suitors.

Nevada, having escaped the end of Forlorn River with only his life, resumes the life of an outlaw, seeking a way out of his situation, but working his way deeper amidst the labyrinthine social network of Arizona, in which everyone is a rustler and no one will say who leads the gangs.

Characters

"Nevada", Ben Ide's trusted riding partner, whose past is a mystery and whose future uncertain.
Ben Ide, wild horse-catcher turned prosperous rancher, he moves his family to Arizona, running into even more wildness than he bargained for.
Ina Ide, formerly Ina Blaine, Ben's wife.
Marvie Blaine, Ina's young brother, intent on living the wild life of both cowboy and gunman.
Hettie Ide, Ben's younger sister, intent on finding the missing Nevada.
Jim Lacy, an infamous gunslinger from Texas.
Rose Hatt, daughter of a family of rustlers.
Cash Burridge, a rustler acquaintance of Nevada's who sells Ben Ide his ranch.
Tom Day, a successful Arizona rancher.
Judge Franklidge, a successful businessman who owns a prosperous ranch.
Elam Hatt, a local rancher and suspected rustler.
Cedar Hatt, no-good son of Elam Hatt.

Adaptations

Nevada was adapted for the screen in 1927 and 1944.

References

1927 American novels
Western (genre) novels
Novels by Zane Grey
Novels set in Arizona
Novels first published in serial form
Works originally published in The American Magazine
American novels adapted into films